Iznogoud (pronounced "he's/is no good" with a French accent) is a French comics series featuring an eponymous character, created by the comics writer René Goscinny and comics artist Jean Tabary. The comic series chronicles the life and times of Iznogoud, the Grand Vizier of the Caliph of Baghdad at an undefined period in the past. His greatest desire is to replace the Caliph, leading him to repeatedly utter the phrase "I want to be Caliph instead of the Caliph" (dethrone him), a phrase that has been adopted in French and some other European languages to characterize overly ambitious people. Iznogoud is supported by his faithful servant, Wa'at Alahf (pronounced "what a laugh").

After the death of Goscinny in 1977 Tabary continued with writing the character. The stories have been translated into several languages, including English, and the title has been adapted to animated and live-action film.

So far 30 graphic novels featuring Iznogoud have been published in French, with at least 26 of those published in English and a number of other languages. Iznogoud was also adapted into a cartoon series produced by Saban Entertainment, with 52 episodes to its name, again with most of them having been translated to other languages as well.

Publication history
The series made its debut in the Franco-Belgian comics magazine Record on 15 January 1962 under the title, Les aventures du Calife Haroun el Poussah. It was eventually recognised that the wicked supporting character ought to be the focus of the strip, and it was renamed Iznogoud. In 1968, it resumed serial publication in Goscinny's Pilote magazine.

Goscinny's taste for sharp satirical writing keeps the repetitive format of the stories constantly fresh, making Iznogoud one of the most popular anti-heroes in the French comic strip world. Goscinny's skills with puns, made famous in Astérix, is also evident in Iznogoud. Most of the puns in the original French make little sense if translated directly into English, requiring of translators (Anthea Bell and Derek Hockridge in the case of the English translations) to find creative solutions for equivalent puns while still keeping within the spirit of the original text.

When Goscinny died in 1977, Tabary eventually decided to carry on the work himself, just as Albert Uderzo did with Asterix. While the Goscinny period was characterized by "albums" comprising several short-length tales each, Tabary turned the series in a new direction, by dedicating every new album entirely to a single story, larger and much more detailed, usually revolving around a new unique concept.

In 1987 a game was produced by Infogrames entitled Iznogoud. The series was adapted to animated film in 1995 with a cartoon TV series, where the caliph is referred to as a sultan. A live-action Iznogoud film starring Michaël Youn and Jacques Villeret, Iznogoud: Calife à la place du calife, was released in France in February 2005.

The publisher Cinebook Ltd is currently publishing English language translations of the books in the Iznogoud series. The first book in the series, "The Wicked Wiles of Iznogoud", was published in March 2008. Further volumes continue to appear at approximately six month intervals. In India, Euro Books published the English versions of 12 Iznogoud titles in 2009.

Synopsis
Iznogoud is Grand Vizier to the Caliph of Baghdad, Haroun El Poussah (Haroun El Plassid in English, a pun on the historical Caliph, Harun al-Rashid; "poussah" is roughly translated as "oaf"). His sole aim in life is to overthrow the Caliph and take his place. This is frequently expressed in his famous catchphrase, "I want to be Caliph instead of the Caliph" ("je veux être calife à la place du calife"), which has passed into everyday French for qualifying over-ambitious people who want to become chief. Iznogoud is always assisted in his plans by his faithful henchman, Dilat Larath (Wa'at Alahf in English, se dilater la rate = have a good laugh, in French).

Supporting characters
Goscinny and Tabary occasionally make appearances themselves. In one episode, Tabary uses a magical time-travelling closet to help Iznogoud seize the Caliph title. In another episode, Iznogoud gets a magical calendar that lets him travel in time when he rips off its pages. He rips too many and he is transported to the 20th century, inside the studio of Tabary. In another episode, Iznogoud gets a magical drawing paper set that makes anybody or anything drawn on it disappear once the paper is torn apart. Unfortunately, the drawing needs to be realistic, and Iznogoud is a poor artist. In search of an art teacher, he meets Tabary, renamed "Tabary El-Retard".

There are occasionally "behind-the-scenes" moments, as when Iznogoud travels in a country in a mirror, and all is reversed, including text in balloons. Tabary is shown complaining to Goscinny about going through this frustrating "reversal" work, and even threatens him with a gun, to convince him into making a non-reversed "translated" version. They also appear debating after a contemporary crowd demands that they make Iznogoud caliph.

Other recurring characters include Sultan Pullmankar (Sultan Streetcar in English), the Caliph's neighbour who is described as a touchy man with a powerful army. Iznogoud often tries to provoke Pullmankar to become angry at the Caliph, in order to instigate a war. However, Pullmankar never gets angry with the caliph, only with Iznogoud.

The crew of Redbeard, another comics series published in Pilote, appears in A Carrot for Iznogoud, as it did in many stories of René Goscinny's most famous creation Asterix.

Bibliography
 Le Grand Vizir Iznogoud (1966, Dargaud) - Translated into English as The Grand Vizier Iznogoud (2012, Cinebook UK)
 Les Complots du Grand Vizir Iznogoud (1967, Dargaud) - Translated into English as The Wicked Wiles of Iznogoud (2008, Cinebook UK)
 Les Vacances du Calife (1968, Dargaud) - Translated into English as The Caliph’s Vacation (2008, Cinebook UK)
 Iznogoud l'infâme (1969, Dargaud) - Translated into English as Iznogoud the Infamous (2011, Cinebook UK)
 Des Astres pour Iznogoud (1969, Dargaud) - Translated into English as Iznogoud Rockets to Stardom (2011, Cinebook UK)
 Iznogoud et l'ordinateur Magique (1970, Dargaud) - Translated into English as Iznogoud and the Magic Computer (2009, Cinebook UK)
 Une Carotte pour Iznogoud (1971, Dargaud) - Translated into English as A Carrot for Iznogoud (2010, Cinebook UK)
 Le Jour des Fous (1972, Dargaud) - Translated into English as Iznogoud and the Day of Misrule (2009, Cinebook UK)
 Le Tapis Magique (1973, Dargaud) - Translated into English as Iznogoud and the Magic Carpet (2010, Cinebook UK)
 Iznogoud l'acharné (1974, Dargaud) - Translated into English as Iznogoud the Relentless (2013, Cinebook UK)
 La Tête de Turc d'Iznogoud (1975, Dargaud) - Translated into English as Iznogoud and the Jigsaw Turk (2014, Cinebook UK)
 Le Conte de Fées d'Iznogoud (1976, Dargaud) - Translated into English as Iznogoud’s Fairy Tale (2015, Cinebook UK)
 Je veux être Calife à la place du Calife (1978, BD Star) - Translated into English as I Want to be Caliph Instead of the Caliph (2016, Cinebook UK)
 Les Cauchemars d'Iznogoud, Tome 1 (1979, Editions de la Séguinière) - Translated into English as Iznogoud’s Nightmares (2017, Cinebook UK)
 L'enfance d'Iznogoud (1981, Glénat)
 Iznogoud et les Femmes (1983, Editions de la Séguinière) - Translated into English as Iznogoud and the Women (2009, Euro Books India)
 Les Cauchemars d'Iznogoud, Tome 4 (1984, Editions de la Séguinière) - Translated into English as Some More Nightmares of Iznogoud (2009, Euro Books India)
 Le Complice d'Iznogoud (1985, Editions de la Séguinière) - Translated into English as The Accomplice of Iznogoud (2009, Euro Books India)
 L'anniversaire d'Iznogoud (1987, Editions de la Séguinière) - Translated into English as The Nightmarish Birthday of Iznogoud (2009, Euro Books India)
 Enfin Calife! (1989, Éditions Tabary) - Translated into English as Caliph at Last! (2009, Euro Books India)
 Le Piège de la Sirène (1992, Éditions Tabary) - Translated into English as The Trap of the Siren (2009, Euro Books India)
 Les Cauchemars d'Iznogoud, Tome 2 (1994, Éditions Tabary) - Translated into English as The Nightmares of Iznogoud (2009, Euro Books India)
 Les Cauchemars d'Iznogoud, Tome 3 (1994, Éditions Tabary) - Translated into English as More Nightmares of Iznogoud (2009, Euro Books India)
 Les Retours d'Iznogoud (1994, Éditions Tabary) - Translated into English as The Returns of Iznogoud (2009, Euro Books India)
 Qui a tué le Calife? (1998, Éditions Tabary) - Translated into English as Who Killed the Caliph? (2009, Euro Books India)
 Un Monstre Sympathique (2000, Éditions Tabary) - Translated into English as A Likeable Monster (2009, Euro Books India)
 La Faute de l'ancêtre (2004, Éditions Tabary) - Translated into English as The Ancestor's Mistake (2009, Euro Books India)
 Les Mille et Une Nuits du Calife (2008, Éditions Tabary)
 Iznogoud Président (2012, IMAV Éditions)
 De Père en Fils (2015, IMAV Éditions)
 Moi, Calife... (2021, IMAV Éditions)

English translations

Animated series

An animated series based on the comics produced by Saban International Paris. The series began airing on Canal+ on October 11, 1996, and ran until March 16, 1997, with reruns airing on France 2 around that time. Ownership of the series passed to Disney in 2001 when Disney acquired Fox Kids Worldwide, which also includes Saban Entertainment. But the series is not available on Disney+.

Episodes

References in society
Notably, the character has also made his mark on French popular culture and public life. Wanting to become "Caliph in the Caliph's place" has become a popular expression in French, describing people perceived as over-ambitious. The Prix Iznogoud (Iznogoud Award) was created in 1992 and is given each year to "a personality who failed to take the Caliph's place", chosen among prominent French figures who have recently known spectacular failures. The award has been given to various personalities, amongst them Édouard Balladur (1995), Nicolas Sarkozy (1999) and Jean-Marie Messier (2002). The jury is headed by politician André Santini, who gave the award to himself after failing to become president of the Île-de-France in the 2004 regional elections.

Sources

 Le calife Haroun el Poussah / Iznogoud publications in Record  and Pilote BDoubliées 
 Iznogoud albums Bedetheque 

Footnotes

External links
 Éditions Tabary official site 
 English publisher of Iznogoud - Cinebook Ltd
 Iznogoud International fansite
 Goscinny official site 
 
 
 Iznogoud in India
 Iznogoud's Latest Albums in India

1962 comics debuts
1990s French animated television series
1995 French television series debuts
1995 French television series endings
Baghdad in fiction
Bandes dessinées
BBC children's television shows
Comics adapted into animated series
Comics adapted into television series
Comics adapted into video games
Comics characters introduced in 1962
Comics set in Iraq
Dargaud titles
Fictional Arabs
Fictional viziers
French children's animated adventure television series
French children's animated comedy television series
French comics adapted into films
French comics characters
French comics titles
Humor comics
Jetix original programming
Male characters in comics
Metafictional comics
Works by René Goscinny
SABC 1 original programming
Satirical comics
Seven Network original programming
Television series based on French comics
Television series by Saban Entertainment
Television series by Disney–ABC Domestic Television
TV Asahi original programming
TVNZ 2 original programming